Viola Richard (26 January 1904 – 28 December 1973) was an American actress.

Biography
Born as Evelyn Viola Richard in 1904 in Hamilton, Ontario, Canada, she appeared in several silent short comedies at the Hal Roach Studios opposite Laurel and Hardy, Charley Chase, and Max Davidson in the 1920s. Pert and vivacious, she left Roach in 1928, but returned in 1935 to play small roles in an Our Gang short and again with Laurel and Hardy in Tit for Tat.

Richard was married three times. Her first marriage, to Alexander Kempner in 1928, ended in divorce in 1938. She married Sydney Rusinow in 1942, but he died in a house fire in 1951. In 1953 she married Lawrence McCafferty, and they remained married until her death; he died in 1979.

Richard died in 1973 in Riverside, California.

She is not to be confused with Viola Agnes Richard (1901–1955) of 20th Century Fox Films' wardrobe department.

Partial filmography

External links

1904 births
1973 deaths
20th-century American actresses
Actresses from Hamilton, Ontario
American film actresses
Hal Roach Studios actors